Kreindler may refer to:

Kreindler & Kreindler LLP, an American law firm
Arthur Kreindler (1900–1988), a Romanian academic
Doris Barsky Kreindler (1901–1974), an American artist
Graig Kreindler (born 1980), an American painter and illustrator